Craig Quinnell (born 9 July 1975, Swansea) is a former Welsh Rugby Union player.

Quinnell played 54 games for the Cardiff club between November 1999 and May 2002 and established himself as one of the backbones of the pack. Though often in the firing line from opposition forwards, he never took a step backwards and was a firm favourite with the Cardiff faithful. He began his senior career with Llanelli and after that joined Richmond for two years. Quinnell left Cardiff in May 2002 to join English club Saracens and, for a short while, Worcester but was among the earliest recruits to the newly established Cardiff Blues, playing for three seasons until his injury enforced retirement.

Quinnell won his first international cap as a flank forward against Fiji in 1995, becoming Wales' first tactical substitution, at the age of 20 and now has 32 international appearances to his name (the majority in the second row). He was a member of the World Cup squad in 1999 and has toured with Wales to Argentina, also in 1999 and Japan two years later.

As a player Quinnell had a fearsome reputation with the ball in his hands, but also had a reputation of being somewhat undisciplined, frequently picking up yellow and red cards. Problems with injury, including a serious spinal injury in 2001, meant that Quinnell never achieved as much as his brother Scott.

On 13 April 2006, Quinnell announced his retirement from professional rugby. This came following a neck injury sustained during a game for the Cardiff Blues against Glasgow Warriors. Doctors told him that he risked being in a wheelchair if he played rugby again.

Craig Quinnell is the son of former Welsh international Derek Quinnell and the younger brother of Scott Quinnell. The youngest Quinnell brother, Gavin, played professionally for the Scarlets.

References

External links
Wales profile

1975 births
Living people
Cardiff Rugby players
Llanelli RFC players
Rugby union locks
Rugby union players from Swansea
Saracens F.C. players
Wales international rugby union players
Welsh rugby union players
Worcester Warriors players
Richmond F.C. players